Ann(e) Nelson may refer to:

 Ann Nelson (coach operator) (1772–1852), coach operator and London publican
 Anne Nelson (born 1954), American author and playwright
 Ann Nelson (1958–2019), particle physicist at the University of Washington
 Ann Nelson (actress), played Mrs. Gertrude Berg on the television series Fame